Jacob Botica is an English-born New Zealand rugby union player who plays as a fly-half for Rennes Étudiants Club Rugby. Previously, he played for RGC 1404 in the Welsh Premiership and the Dragons and also made one appearance for the Scarlets in the Anglo-Welsh Cup.

He is the son of former dual-code rugby international Frano Botica.

References

External links
Eurosport profile
RGC1404 profile

1992 births
Living people
Dragons RFC players
English people of New Zealand descent
English rugby union players
RGC 1404 players
Rugby union fly-halves
Rugby union players from Wigan
New Zealand rugby union players
Scarlets players
SU Agen Lot-et-Garonne players